Jan Paul van Hecke (born 8 June 2000) is a Dutch professional footballer who plays as a defender for Brighton & Hove Albion of the Premier League and the Netherlands under-21 national team.

Club career

Early career 
Born in Arnemuiden, Van Hecke is a youth product of VV Goes, but signed for NAC Breda in 2018. He made his professional debut with NAC Breda in a 5–1 Eerste Divisie win over Helmond Sport on 16 August 2019.

Brighton & Hove Albion
On 10 September 2020, van Hecke joined Premier League side Brighton & Hove Albion on a three-year contract.

Loans
On 18 September 2020, he returned to the Netherlands on a season-long loan with Eredivisie side Heerenveen. He made his debut for Heeerenveen in a 3–1 Eredivisie win away to Fortuna Sittard on 19 September 2020.

On 29 August 2021, he joined Blackburn Rovers of the Championship on loan for the 2021–22 season. He made his debut on 16 October, playing the whole match of the 2–2 home draw against Coventry City. He was sent off for a reckless challenge on Harry Wilson on his fifth appearance with Rovers already 2–0 down in an eventual 7–0 thumping at home to Fulham on 3 November. Van Hecke scored his first goal for Blackburn and in English football, doubling Rovers lead with a powerful header in the 2–0 away win at second placed Bournemouth on 11 December, closing the gap to four points to their promotion rivals. He was named as the club's Player of the Season for 2021–22, becoming the first loanee to achieve the accolade.

Breakthrough with the Seagulls
Van Hecke made his debut for the Seagulls on 24 August 2022, helping keep a clean sheet in the 3–0 away victory over League One side Forest Green Rovers in the EFL Cup second round. Three days later, he made his Premier League debut, coming on as a 88th minute substitute for Danny Welbeck and helped secure Brighton's 1–0 lead over Leeds to take all three points at Falmer Stadium. With the absence of Levi Colwill, Van Hecke was selected ahead of Adam Webster where he made his first Premier League start on 21 January 2023, in the 2–2 away draw at Leicester City.

International career
Van Hecke was called up to the Netherlands under-21 squad for the first time in March 2022, but was an unused substitute in a 0–0 UEFA European Under-21 Championship qualifying draw against Bulgaria. He made his debut for the under-21 side on 3 June, coming on as a substitute in the 3–0 away win over Moldova under-21's in a 2023 European under-21 Championship qualifier.

Personal life
Van Hecke is the nephew of the Dutch retired footballer Jan Poortvliet.

Career statistics

Honours
Individual
 Blackburn Rovers Player of the Season: 2021–22

References

External links

2000 births
Living people
People from Middelburg, Zeeland
Dutch footballers
Footballers from Zeeland
Association football defenders
Eredivisie players
Eerste Divisie players
English Football League players
Premier League players
VV Goes players
NAC Breda players
Brighton & Hove Albion F.C. players
SC Heerenveen players
Blackburn Rovers F.C. players
Dutch expatriate footballers
Dutch expatriate sportspeople in England
Expatriate footballers in England